Christfried Schmidt (born 26 November 1932) is a German composer and arrangeur.

Life 
Schmidt was born in 1932 as the son of a miller in Markersdorf. In Görlitz, he attended the grammar school and received piano lessons from Humperdinck's pupil Emil Kühnel. In Leipzig, he familiarised himself with Neue Musik with Hermann Heyer.

From 1960 to 1962, Schmidt was a church musician in Forst. From 1963 to 1964, he worked as an acting bandmaster in Quedlinburg and then from 1965 to 1980 was a freelance piano teacher and choir director in Quedlinburg. In Warsaw, he met the Japanese musicologist Ichirō Tamura, who enabled him to perform his works in Japan. Since 1980, he has been living as a freelance composer in Berlin-Prenzlauer Berg. The artistic breakthrough came with the premiere of his oboe concerto performed by Burkhard Glaetzner at the DDR-Musiktagen 1984.

His orchestral work Memento was premiered in 2002 in the Leipziger Gewandhaus by the MDR Leipzig Radio Symphony Orchestra conducted by Fabio Luisi.

In 2019, the Sing-Akademie zu Berlin under Kai-Uwe Jirka premiered his St. Mark Passion from 1975 after 45 years. The highly expressive, headstrong work combines aleatoric compositional procedures (influenced by Witold Lutosławski's controlled aleatoric music) with a polyphonic way of thinking in the wake of J.S. Bach and the Viennese School.

Awards and memberships 
 1971: Composition prize in Nürnberg
 1973: Composition prize in Stettin
 1976: Composition prize in Triest
 1978: Kompositionspreis in Boswil
 1987: Kunstpreis der DDR
 1990: Member of the Academy of Arts, Berlin, (East) (until 1991)
 1991: 
 1998: Member of the Sächsische Akademie der Künste
 1999: Berliner Kunstpreis (Promotion Prize)

Work

Further reading 
 Ursula Stürzbecher: Komponisten in der DDR. 17 Gespräche. Hildesheim 1979, .
 Georg-Friedrich Kühn: Unbefangen, ungebärdig. Die Extreme des Ausdrucks. Glied der musikalischen Gesellschaft: Christfried Schmidt. In Musik-Texte 4/1984
 Frank Schneider: Klang-Bilder. Ein alter Aspekt in neuer Musik der DDR. In Bildende Kunst 6/1984
 Frank Schneider: Christfried Schmidt. In Prospekt Deutscher Verlag für Musik. Leipzig 1987
 Gerald Felber: Verletzbare Leidenschaftlichkeit. Der Komponist Christfried Schmidt. In Sonntag 36/1987
 Habakuk Traber: Notizen. Christfried Schmidt zum 60. Geburtstag.In Neue Zeitschrift für Musik 12/1992.
 Beate Schröder-Nauenburg: Christfried Schmidt. In Komponisten der Gegenwart (KDG). Edition Text & Kritik, Munich 1996,

References

External links 
 
 

20th-century classical composers
German composers
German music arrangers
1932 births
Living people
People from Görlitz (district)